The 1991–92 Courage National 4 North was the fifth full season of rugby union within the fourth tier of the English league system, currently known as National League 2 North, and counterpart to the Courage National 4 South (now National League 2 South).  At the end of the season, newly promoted Aspatria made it a second promotion in a row by qualifying for the 1992–93 National Division 3, 1 point clear of Hereford.  

At the other end of the table, Northern and Vale of Lune were the two sides to go down.  Vale of Lune were the more competitive, finishing dead level with Walsall on 7 points each, but in the end a worse for/against record condemned the Lancaster side to their second relegation in a row.  Both Northern and Vale of Lune would drop to North 1.

Structure

Each team played one match against each of the other teams, playing a total of ten matches each.  The champions are promoted to National Division 3 and the bottom team was relegated to either North 1 or Midlands 1 depending on their locality.

Participating teams and locations

League table

Sponsorship
Division 4 North is part of the Courage Clubs Championship and was sponsored by Courage Brewery.

See also
 National League 2 North

References

N4
National League 2 North